Palpita perlucidalis is a moth in the family Crambidae. It was described by Inoue in 1999. It is found in Indonesia (Java).

References

Moths described in 1999
Palpita
Moths of Indonesia